Graco is an American manufacturer of fluid-handling systems and products based in Minneapolis, Minnesota.

History
Russell Gray, a Minneapolis parking lot attendant, founded Gray Company, Inc. in 1926 with his brother Leil Gray to produce and sell Russell's air-powered grease gun, invented in response to cold weather making hand-powered grease guns inoperable. Sales their first year of operation were $35,000. 

By 1941, annual sales had reached $1 million. They capitalized on opportunities in defense-based lubricating needs during World War II. After World War II, Graco began expanding outside of lubricant handling, developing a paint pump and direct-from-drum industrial fluids pumps. 

By the mid-1950s they had expanded to $5 million in sales and 400 employees, and were servicing fluid handling needs in a wide variety of industries. 

Leil Gray died in 1958, and was succeeded as president by Harry A. Murphy. He was succeeded in turn by David A Koch in 1962. The company continued to expand, helped by the 1957 introduction of the airless spray gun. By 1969, when Gray Company went public and changed its name to Graco, it had annual sales of $33 million.

After acquiring H. G. Fischer & Co, a manufacturer of electrostatic finishing products, sales continued to climb, reflecting an industry-wide shift in automobile painting from air-based to electrostatic technologies. By 1979, sales had climbed to $100 million.

In 1981, Graco started a joint-venture called Graco Robotics, Inc. (GRI) with Edon Finishing Systems.

Divisions

Contractor Equipment Division
Graco currently has airless sprayers, line striping units, fine finish equipment, texture sprayers, roof coating rigs, and pressure washers on the Contractor Equipment Division (CED).

Lubrication Equipment Division 
In the Lubrication Equipment Division (LED), Graco produces automatic lubrication equipment, vehicle lubrication maintenance and repair equipment, and a variety of activators and switches for the lubrication process.

Industrial Products Division 
In Graco's Industrial Products Division (IPD), there are a wide range of pneumatic, hydraulic, and electric pumps created to withstand tough finishing applications. IPD also has different fine-finish pump packages which can spray with air, assisted by air, or airless.

Markets served
Graco serves a wide variety of markets, including painting, anti-corrosion, fluid transfer, gluing and sanitary applications, automotive, aeronautic, body refinish, wood, building and construction, and marine. They distribute through a global network of equipment dealers and retail stores.

References

External links
 The   historical corporate records of Graco are available for research use at the Minnesota Historical Society.

Companies listed on the New York Stock Exchange
Manufacturing companies based in Minneapolis
Manufacturing companies established in 1926
Industrial machine manufacturers
American brands